Therioplectes is a genus of horse fly in the family Tabanidae.

Species
Therioplectes albicauda Olsufiev, 1937
Therioplectes canofasciatus (Austen, 1912)
Therioplectes carabaghensis (Portschinsky, 1877)
Therioplectes charopus (Lichtenstein, 1796)
Therioplectes gigas (Herbst, 1787)
Therioplectes griseus (Enderlein, 1925)
Therioplectes hottentottus (Lichtenstein, 1796)
Therioplectes kuehlhorni Moucha & Chvála, 1964
Therioplectes ruwenzorii (Ricardo, 1908)
Therioplectes tricolor Zeller, 1842
Therioplectes tunicatus (Szilády, 1927)
Therioplectes zumpti (Dias, 1956)

References 

Tabanidae
Brachycera genera
Taxa named by Philipp Christoph Zeller
Diptera of Europe